San Martín de Porres (SMP) is a district in Lima, Peru, located in the north area of the city. It is bordered by the Chillón River, marks its natural border with Ventanilla and Puente Piedra on the north; Callao on the west; Los Olivos, Comas (disputed areas) on the northeast; Rímac and Independencia districts on the east; The Rímac River marks its natural border with Lima District and Carmen de la Legua Reynoso on the south.

History 
Since 1945, continuous invasions of territory in what was then part of the Carabayllo District, ended up in the creation of the Distrito Obrero Industrial 27 de Octubre on May 22, 1950, which is still celebrated as the district's anniversary. The district was composed of the following haciendas: Chuquitanta, Pro, Naranjal, Infantas, Santa Rosa, Garagay Alto, G. Bajo, Chavarría, Mulería, Aliaga, Condevilla, San José, Palao, Huerta Sol, Oquendo, San Agustín and Marquez. The last three became part of Callao province, in 1956.

In 1962, after the canonization of St. Martin de Porras, the name of the district was changed to its current name. Although historians have shown that the saint's actual last name was Porras, the district has retained the original spelling.

The district of Los Olivos was created in 1989, stripping some of San Martín de Porres' northeastern territory.

Borderline conflicts 
Due to the territorial reduction due to the creation of the Los Olivos district, two conflict zones arise, one with the Independencia District and the other with the Comas District. These districts argue that, when Los Olivos was created, part of the old industrial zone in San Martín de Porres would correspond to them to be annexed, however, according to San Martín de Porres, the law for the creation of a new district could not detail the transfer of territory to others not involved and because it was not an express request of the residents. It also highlights that the laws creating Comas (Law No. 13757) and Independence (Law No. 14965, Law No. 16012) mark their limits on the Old Pan-American North (today Avenida Túpac Amaru).The conflict remains and both zones are not yet defined by the Metropolitan Planning Institute, the Metropolitan Municipality of Lima or the Congress of the Republic.

Conflict with Independencia district 
The first zone in territorial conflict is with the district of Independencia, in a quadrangular shape of 2.40 square kilometers. It is delimited by Av. Panamericana Norte, Av. Naranjal, Avenida Tupac Amaru and Avenida Tomas Valle, and contains the urbanizations Naranjal, Industrial, Mesa Redonda, Mulería, Industrial El Naranjal, Industria Panamericana Norte and the El Naranjal Housing Association. The conflict also affects the municipal tax system since the large shopping centers pay taxes to Independencia, however the urbanizations and small and medium businesses pay taxes in San Martín de Porres.

Conflict with Comas district 
The second zone in territorial conflict is with the district of Comas, in a triangular shape of 1.28 square kilometers. It is delimited by Av. San Bernardo, Av. Panamericana Norte and Avenida Gerardo Unger, up to the next bank of the Chillón River, and contains the urbanizations Santa Luisa, Santa Rosa de Infantas, Pro Industrial IV and IX Sector III Stage; the Municipal Human Settlement No. 02; and the housing associations José de San Martín, José Carlos Mariátegui and San Miguel. The conflict also affects the municipal tax system since medium-sized and small businesses are taxed in both municipalities, however urbanizations are taxed in San Martín de Porres.

Geography 

Authorities

Mayors 
 2022-2026: Hernán Tomás Sifuentes Barca (PP)
 2019-2021: Julio Abraham Chávez Chiong (AP)
 2015-2018: Adolfo Israel Mattos Piaggio (SU)
 2011-2014: Freddy Ternero † (PPC)
 2007-2010: Freddy Ternero † (SP)
 2003-2006: Lucio Campos Huayta (UN)
 1999-2002: Gladys Ugaz de Vera (SP)
 1996-1998: Jaime Kanashiro Ywamoto (C90-NM)
 1993-1995: José Arcenio Rubio Valqui (OBRAS)
 1990-1992: Marcelino Morales Scandon (FREDEMO-AP)
 1987-1989: José Isaac Miranda Valladares (IU)
 1984-1986: José Isaac Miranda Valladares (IU)
 1981-1983: Willy Fernández Melo (IU)
 1967-1969: Enrique León Velarde Gamarra † (AP-DC)
 1964-1966: Víctor Reyes Ramos (APRA-UNO)

Urban landmarks 
There are shopping centers and institutions, some of which are located in the disputed areas with Comas and Independencia, these are:

 Cayetano Heredia University

 Plaza Norte (North Plaza Mall), the largest shopping center in the country
 MegaPlaza Norte
 Real Plaza Pro
 Royal Plaza
 Plaza Center

 Metro
 Mercado Unicachi Pro
 Tottus
 PlazaVea
 SODIMAC

 San Ignacio de Loyola University

 Cibertec
 Certus

 ICPNA - Peruvian North American Cultural Institute

Avenues 
     Carretera Panamericana Norte (PE-1N Pan American highway)
Avenida Caquetá
     Avenida Zarumilla (PE-1N)
     Avenida Eduardo de Habich
     Avenida Túpac Amaru (PE-20A)
     Avenida Canta Callao (PE-20)
     Avenida Naranjal
     Avenida Carlos Izaguirre
Avenida Los Alisos
Avenida 25 de Enero
Avenida San Bernardo
Avenida Próceres
Avenida José Granda
     Avenida Bocanegra
     Avenida Angélica Gamarra
     Avenida Tomás Valle
     Avenida Universitaria
     Avenida Germán Aguirre
     Avenida José Granda
     Avenida Lima
     Avenida Pacasmayo
     Avenida Perú
     Avenida Los Próceres
     Avenida 12 de Octubre
     Avenida Salaverry
     Avenida Quilca

Neighborhoods 
     Urb Barrio Obrero
     Urb Caquetá
     Urb Miguel Grau
     Urb Zarumilla
     Urb Ingenieria
     Urb Palao
     Urb Los Jardines
     Urb Fiori
     Urb Perú
     Urb Condevilla Señor
     Urb San Germán
     Urb Antares
     Urb Los Libertadores
     Urb El Pacífico
     Urb Garagay
     Urb Valdivieso
     Urb Naranjal (In dispute with Independencia)
     Urb Mesa Redonda (In dispute with Independencia)
     Urb Industrial Panamericana (In dispute with Independencia)
     Urb Infantas (In dispute with Comas)
     Urb Santa Luisa (In dispute with Comas)
     Urb Industrial Pro (In dispute with Comas)

Pre-Hispanic Buildings (Huacas) 
Huaca El Paraiso
 Huaca Garagay
 Huaca Palao

See also 
 Administrative divisions of Peru
 Largest cities in the Americas
 List of districts of Lima
 List of metropolitan areas of Peru
 List of people from Lima
 List of sites of interest in the Lima Metropolitan area
 Ancient Buildings in Coast of Peru

References

External links

  Municipalidad Distrital de San Martín de Porres - San Martín de Porres district council official website
  Universidad Cayetano Heredia

Districts of Lima